Moll Flanders is a 1975 British historical television series based on the novel of the same title by Daniel Defoe. Starring Julia Foster in the title role, it originally aired on BBC 2 in two episodes.

Cast
 Julia Foster as Betty / Moll Flanders
 Kenneth Haigh as Jemmy Earle
 Ian Ogilvy as Humphrey Oliver
 Diana Fairfax as Lady Verney
 Jeremy Clyde as Edward
 Madge Ryan as Mrs. Oliver
 Barry Jackson as William Stubbs
 Paul Lavers as Robin
 Ania Marson as Phillipa
 Lynne Jones as	Catherine
 David Battley as Henry Haydock
 Karin MacCarthy as Meg
 Patrick Newell as Thomas Woodall
 Maureen Pryor as Mrs. Gill
 Geoffrey Chater as George Mace
 Jack Galloway as Andrew Bullen
 Sheila Reid as Jenny
 James Mellor as Capt. Preston
 Nelly Griffiths as Mrs. Owen
 Keith Smith as Barnaby
 James Smith as Bank Clerk
 Mary Hanefey as Maid
 Clyde Pollitt as Thin Man
 Lysandre De La Haye as Child
 Sam Avent as Draper
 Roy McArthur as Card Player
 Jimmy Mac as Card Player

References

Bibliography
 Klossner, Michael. The Europe of 1500–1815 on Film and Television: A Worldwide Filmography of Over 2,550 Works, 1895 Through 2000. McFarland & Company, 2002.

External links
 

BBC television dramas
1975 British television series debuts
1975 British television series endings
English-language television shows
Television shows based on British novels
Television series set in the 17th century
Television shows set in London